Oxycarboxin is an organic compound used as a fungicide. It is an anilide.

Uses
Oxycarboxin is used to control rust diseases (e.g. soybean rust).

History
Oxycarboxin has been commercially available since 1966.

Preparation
Oxycarboxin is prepared from acetoacetanilide and 2-mercaptoethanol.

References

Anilides
Sulfones
Fungicides